Diapason may refer to:

 Diapason (interval), the name of the just octave in Pythagorean tuning
 Diapason (pipe organ), a tonal grouping of the flue pipes of a pipe organ
 Diapason (magazine), a French classical music magazine
 The Diapason (magazine), an American magazine for organ builders and players
 Diapason normal, the official French standard of concert pitch
 Diapason, a 1978 novel by Thomas Sullivan

See also
 Tuning fork (diapason in Italian and French)